Vaanam is a 2011 Indian Tamil-language action drama film written and directed by Krish. It is the remake of his own Telugu film Vedam (2010) starring Allu Arjun, Manchu Manoj and Anushka Shetty. It features an ensemble cast of Silambarasan, Bharath, Anushka Shetty, Prakash Raj, Saranya Ponvannan, Sonia Agarwal, and Santhanam. The score and soundtrack were composed by Yuvan Shankar Raja, while cinematography and editing were handled by Nirav Shah and Anthony Gonsalves, respectively. The film, jointly produced by VTV Ganesh and R. Ganesh under VTV Productions and Magic Box Pictures, respectively was distributed by Dayanidhi Azhagiri's Cloud Nine Movies.

Vaanam is a hyperlink cinema film, with the story revolving around the lives of five individuals from different walks of life, representing the five natural elements — aether, air, water, fire, and earth—and illustrates how their fates intertwine on New Year's Eve at a hospital in Chennai. The film was released on 29 April 2011, opening to universal critical acclaim and had a 100 days run at the box-office.

Plot
Thillai "Cable" Raja is a cable operator born and raised in a slum area in Chennai. He bemoans his poverty and wishes to become rich by marrying his girlfriend Priya. He cons her into believing he is well off and adopts a well-bred persona in front of her. Raja is always accompanied by his best friend Seenu and guided by Bhajan singer Ganesh. When he is asked by Priya to buy high-priced passes to a New Year's Eve gala, he finds himself severely short of money. After a failed attempt at chain snatching and crossing paths with the police, he heads to a hospital with theft on his mind.

Bharath Chakravarthy is an aspiring rockstar from Bangalore who is irresponsible but well-meaning. His mother disapproves of his dreams and wishes him to become an Army officer, which he opposes. When his band misses their flight to a live concert because of him, he takes them to Chennai via road. En route, Bharath and his girlfriend Laasya are attacked by religious fanatics, but are aided by strangers, which causes him to reflect on life. They finally arrive in Chennai, but their vehicle collides with an auto rickshaw carrying a pregnant woman. Sacrificing their concert, Bharath and Laasya rush her to the hospital.

Saroja is a prostitute working at Rani Amma's brothel at the Tamil Nadu-Andhra border. When she discovers that her life is constantly in danger while working there, she escapes to Chennai with her sister Karpooram, a eunuch, in hopes of starting her own business venture. On arrival, she is hounded by thugs and policemen, ultimately being led into a trap. In an ensuing fight, Karpooram is mortally wounded. Desperate, Saroja carries her to the hospital.

Rahimuddin Qureshi and his wife Zara had lost their unborn twins in a communal riot in Coimbatore. When Zara becomes pregnant again a few months later, Rahim heads to Chennai to locate his younger brother, who had run away following the riots. There, he comes into repeated conflict with anti-Muslim officer Shivaram, who suspects him of being a terrorist. Despite his claims of innocence, Rahim is brutally assaulted by Shivaram and is admitted in the hospital under close watch.

Lakshmi is the daughter-in-law of a poor weaver in Thoothukudi. When the weaver is unable to pay back a loan to a cruel moneylender Narasimman, the latter kidnaps Lakshmi's young son, a bright student, and refuses to release him until his debt is cleared. Lakshmi arrives in Chennai with her father-in-law, hoping to sell her kidney to obtain the money. After initial hassles, she undergoes the operation and receives the money, although it is still insufficient. At that point, Raja enters and steals the cash from her, ignoring her pleas. In a state of despair, Lakshmi and her father-in-law attempt suicide.

Struck by his conscience, Raja is unable to continue his plan. He admits the truth to Priya and returns the money, even adding in some of his own money to give up, thus gaining Lakshmi's forgiveness. Meanwhile, Rahim discovers that terrorist leader Mansoor Khan and his gang are planning to kill all the people at the hospital. Rahim tries to escape, but on seeing Bharath wheeling in a pregnant woman, he is reminded of his wife and offers to help them. The terrorist strike begins, and several people are shot dead. Raja, Bharath, Rahim, and Saroja lead a small bunch of survivors to an abandoned room.

Raja and Bharath fight and kill a terrorist one-on-one, with Bharath sustaining multiple bullet wounds to his shoulder in order to save Saroja. Rahim saves Shivaram from a shooter and comes face to face with his brother, who is part of the terrorist gang. When confronted, Rahim's brother shoots himself. Just then, Khan reveals himself to be a suicide bomber, and primes to explode. Raja sacrifices himself by pulling Khan and falling out of the window, followed by the explosion.

In the aftermath, Bharath has lost one of his hands but is alive; he is hailed as a national hero. Saroja and Karpooram head toward a new decent life, hoping to find redemption. Lakshmi and her father-in-law manage to pay off Narasimman and give her son a proper education. Shivaram apologizes to Rahim and asks for forgiveness, which he grants and accepts him as a brother. Raja is mourned by the people in his community and Priya, while Ganesh and Seenu hail him as a martyr.

Cast

Production

Development 
After Tamil producer R. B. Choudary had bought the rights of Vedam for a "hefty amount" to remake it in Tamil, his younger son Jeeva was initially supposed to play the role enacted by Allu Arjun in the original film, while either Namitha or Anushka Shetty were reported to essay the lead female role of Saroja. However, to the surprise of all, Silambarasan secured the lead role, who had seen the original version and was immediately impressed by the "Cable" Raju character, and started shooting for the film from early July, while he was expected to work on Podaa Podi during that period. By accepting this film, Silambarasan was said to have lost the project with N. Linguswamy and Dayanidhi Azhagiri, who were unhappy about Silambarasan starting to shoot for this film without informing them and further delaying their film.

Casting 
Meanwhile, Anushka was reported to have denied the offer, following which Taapsee Pannu, who was the female lead in Vetrimaran's Aadukalam, was considered for the prostitute character, Saroja. During the launch of the film then, sources claimed that Anushka, following her refusal, had been hired by the producers for an item number only, which was specially included for the Tamil version and didn't feature in the original, for which she was supposedly paid an "exorbitant price". However, Anushka dismissed all these reports and eventually confirmed that she would reprise her role from the original, citing that "at no point did I refuse to be a part of this project". Some of her scenes from Vedam were dubbed and used in this film. Mohan Babu's son Manoj Manchu was also supposed to reprise his original character and enact the rockstar role in Vaanam, but was forced to opt out, following an accident during the shoot of his Telugu film Jhummandi Naadam and had to undergo an operation. He was replaced by Bharath, who was approached by Silambarasan himself for the role and immediately agreed as he loved  Vedam.

For the character played by Deeksha Seth in the original, Sneha Ullal was initially hired. She was to make her Tamil debut with this film and play Silambarasan's love interest. Vega Tamotia was hired to essay a rock musician, played originally by Lekha Washington, being paired to Bharath, while producer Ganesh would appear in a cameo role, too. In September 2010, Sonia Agarwal was also signed up for a pivotal role, returning to acting after four years, replacing Siya Gautham as Zara, the wife of Prakash Raj's character, which she was initially supposed to play in the original version itself, but eventually missed due to personal problems. Compared to the original, however, she cited that she would have more scenes and one "extra song". Prakash Raj himself, would play a Muslim, enacting Manoj Bajpai's role from the original. Noted Telugu actor Ravi Prakash was hired to play the same role he did in the original version, making his Tamil film debut. However, there was a turn of events in early 2011, as Sneha Ullal, who had already shot for significant portions, was replaced by Delhi-based model Jasmin Bhasin. Jasmin, who completed her portions in 15 days and also dubbed for herself, had initially auditioned for the rock musician role of Vega Tamotia. Furthermore, scenes shot with Jagan were removed from the project, and then filmed with Santhanam after Jagan had fallen out with Silambarasan.

Music

While Krish worked with composer M. M. Keeravani for the score and soundtrack of the original film, Yuvan Shankar Raja was approached and assigned as the music director of Vaanam to produce original songs and score, owing to his friendship with lead actor Silambarasan, who recommended him. In a novel attempt, the song "Evan Di Unna Pethan" was separately released as a single track to promote and popularise the film. The track was initially planned to be launched in London, but after several complications and delays, it was officially unveiled on 1 December 2010, at the Citi Center, Chennai, four months ahead of the actual audio launch.

While the original soundtrack consisted of eight tracks, the Vaanam soundtrack featured only five tracks, including the earlier released single. The entire soundtrack album was finally launched on 30 March 2011 at the Residency Towers in Chennai in a simple manner. Na. Muthukumar had penned lyrics for three songs, while the other two songs ("Evan Di Unna Pethan" and "Cable Raja") were penned by the singers themselves. Film composer Srikanth Deva had lent his voice for the fifth song, collaborating with Yuvan Shankar for the first time, as did the composer-duo Abhishek-Lawrence.

Reception

The soundtrack received positive reviews from music critics. Richard Mahesh from Behindwoods.com gave a 3/5 rating and said "'Vaanam' can be regarded as one of the Yuvan’s better composition and it is sure to make high waves now. While 'Evandi Unna Pethan', 'Vaanam' and 'Who Am I' touches the surpassing degrees on different styles, 'Cable Raja only if he can' and 'No Money' caters to the tastes of mass audiences." Kollywoodz said "On the whole, 'Vaanam' has a power-packed performance by Yuvan Shankar Raja. Sony BMG fetches one more feather to its cap following the huge success of 'Engeyum Kadhal' and 'Ko'." Pavithra Srinivasan of Rediff gave a 2.5/5 rating and said "Like some of Yuvan's most recent albums, Vaanam too, scores in some areas: the number Vaanam and Who am I. The rest fall into the Yuvan template, while the appeal of Evandi Unnai Pethan is almost purely its in-your-face lyrics. For those who hoped for melodious numbers, this one might prove a dampener." Indiaglitz said "The audio album of Vaanam strikes an instant appeal. While all the songs are beautiful in their own right, Evandi Unna Pethan and No Money are picks of the lot, as both come with that special touch."

Release
Vaanam was initially slated to release on 11 February 2011, to coincide with the Valentines Day weekend. However the release of the film was pushed to April 2011; Since the 2011 Cricket World Cup which held on India, will end on 2 April 2011, the makers fixed the release date of the film as the same date, which coincides the Yugadi weekend. The release of the film was further pushed to 29 April 2011.

Reception

Box office
The film collected 90 lakhs at the Chennai box office in its first weekend, notably without much publicity. The film recovered its production cost and publicity in its first week itself by share. At the end of its seventh week, the film had collected 4.5 crore in Chennai alone and was declared a success. The film crossed 10 weeks in Chennai.

Critical response
Vaanam garnered positive response. Behindwoods.com rated it as three and a half out of five, citing that the film was "succulent with diverse complex human emotions from deceit to greed to rage to remorse. The film has a plot that can find patrons among wider variety of audience as the theme of humanity is much a catholic one that transcends barriers", going to describe the film as an "intelligent fare with substance". Rediff's Pavithra Srinivasan rated it as three out of five and stated that Vaanam was "engaging", further adding that "if you ignore the minor lapses, you've got a reasonably engaging story, and a moving climax." Sify.com's critic felt the film was "very good", citing that the "this short story genre [...] manages to work well for the new age audience. Almost all the stories are deftly told, with the mandatory twist in the climax which keeps you riveted". The reviewer further praised the director and his team as they "push the cinematic envelope and bring savvy freshness to Tamil cinema". A reviewer from Indiaglitz.com wrote that Vaanam was a "novel attempt in Tamil cinema and Krish pulls it off well thanks to a beautifully conceived script and well-written characters", comparing the film to "reading a set of interesting short stories". A Oneindia critic claimed that "the first half was entertaining and the second half makes the audience to sit on the edge of their seats", while pointing out that "the common and mass audiences could not understand the story because of its clumsy nature". Krish was labelled as the "real hero" of the film and was lauded for "writing a ripping story, excellent screenplay and brilliant direction".
Malathi Rangarajan from The Hindu said "Pithy, poignant, funny and serious as the situation warrants, dialogue (Gnanagiri) is a highpoint of Vaanam. Climax is another. Krish seems to have cut and pasted a few scenes from the Telugu original – they give a dubbed-film feel to Vaanam. Coming after the stupendous hit, VTV, Vaanam should be another significant film in STR's career."

In contrast, Rohit Ramachandran of nowrunning.com gave the film one out of five, stating that "Vaanam is an unrealistic film about uninteresting people that deadlocks into blandness." National Film Award winning critic Baradwaj Rangan wrote that his "glass-half-full side wants to deliver a smallish pat on Vaanam'''s back and label it [...] a "praiseworthy attempt", especially within mainstream parameters", while the "glass-half-empty side" was "still shaking angry fists at what could have and should have been a milestone", criticising that "half the story strands are simply not interesting enough".

 Accolades 
Silambarasan received the ITFA Best Actor Award for his performance in Vaanam. Anushka Shetty was nominated for ITFA Best Actress Award and Edison Award for Best Actress. Santhanam received the Chennai Times Awards and SIIMA Awards for "Best Actor in a Comic Role" and "Best Comedian" respectively.

Controversies
In August 2011, actor Bharath alleged that he did not receive much attention for being in the film and stated that he was completely "boycotted" during the film's promotions. He added that he was given favourable publicity during his first multi-starrer Pattiyal (2006), and that Vaanam gave importance only to "one particular actor" – its main lead Silambarasan. In response to this, Silambarasan said that he did not "have any say in promotions", which he claimed was the producer's decision, and added, "Though Mankatha is a multi-starrer, it is and it will be publicized as an Ajith film. Likewise, though popular actors like Jiiva and Srikanth are there in Nanban'', it will be promoted as a Vijay starrer".

The song "Evan Di Unna Pethan" faced severe opposition for its provocative lyrics by Silambarasan. A women's rights organisation in Chennai criticised the lyrics and issued a statement to Silambarasan for the lyrics being "chauvinistic" that "demean women". Further it was argued that "music needs to appeal to larger sections than to the 'thrill-seeking' youth who are often misguided into 'cheap thrills' because of such songs", demanding censorship. However, several prominent people from the film industry came to support stating that there have been more objectionable scenes in films in the past and that there were "bigger issues in society" and applying censorship was not "the ideal way out in democracy."

References

External links
 Official website
 
Vanam OTT Release Date

2011 films
Tamil remakes of Telugu films
Hyperlink films
2010s Tamil-language films
Indian action drama films
Films about prostitution in India
Films scored by Yuvan Shankar Raja
Indian nonlinear narrative films
Films directed by Krish
2011 drama films